The Scheffelsberg is a forested mountain south of Jugel in the western Saxon Ore Mountains, which is 980 metres high. The Czech-German border runs over its summit.

In winter, a cross-country skiing trail runs from Henneberg via the Scheffelsberg towards the border. In clear visibility there is a good view of the Saxon-Bohemian upper Ore Mountains from the nearby peak of Buchschachtelberg through the trees.

Literature 
Wander- und Wintersportkarte des Erzgebirges, Sheet 3 - Auersberg, im Auftrag des Sächs. Finanzministeriums published by the Reichsamt für Landesaufnahme, 1928.

Mountains of the Ore Mountains
Mountains and hills of the Czech Republic
Mountains of Saxony
Johanngeorgenstadt
Erzgebirgskreis